Étoutteville is a commune in the Seine-Maritime department in the Normandy region in northern France.

Geography

Population

Places of interest
 The church of St. Thomas, dating from the thirteenth century.
 The ruins of a feudal castle at Bois-des-Mottes.
 The seventeenth-century château de Plainbosc, with a dovecote.
 The château de Saint-Côme.
 The chapel of Saint-Côme at Etainnemare, built in 1825.

See also
Communes of the Seine-Maritime department

References

Communes of Seine-Maritime